The Chichirgeaua is a right tributary of the Danube in Romania. It flows into the Danube near Tichilești.

References

Rivers of Romania
Rivers of Constanța County